Beuel (Ripuarian: Büel) is a city borough (Stadtbezirk) of Bonn, Germany. It has a population of 67,827 (2020).

Subdivisions
Beuel is composed of the sub-districts Beuel-Mitte, Beuel-Ost, Geislar, Hoholz, Holtorf, Holzlar, Küdinghoven, Limperich, Oberkassel, Pützchen/Bechlinghoven, Ramersdorf, Schwarzrheindorf/Vilich-Rheindorf, Vilich and Vilich-Müldorf.

Twin towns – sister cities

Beuel is twinned with:
 Mirecourt, France (1969)

References

Urban districts and boroughs of Bonn